Walter Lane may refer to:
 Walter P. Lane (1817–1892), Confederate general during the American Civil War
 Walter B. Lane (1925–1989), American photojournalist